Phyllonorycter pumila is a moth of the family Gracillariidae. It is known from Spain.

The larvae feed on Genista versicolor pumila. They probably mine the leaves of their host plant.

References

pumila
Moths of Europe
Moths described in 2006